This is a demography of the population of Suriname, including population density, ethnicity, education level, health of the populace, economic status, religious affiliations, and other aspects of the population.

Most Surinamese people live in the narrow, northern coastal plain. The population is one of the most ethnically varied in the world. Each ethnic group preserves its own culture, and many institutions, including political parties, tend to follow ethnic lines. Informal relationships vary: the upper classes of all ethnic backgrounds mix freely; outside of the elite, social relations tend to remain within ethnic groupings. All groups may be found in the schools and workplace.

Population

The proportion of children below the age of 15 in 2010 was 28.6%, 65% was between 15 and 65 years of age, while 6.5% was 65 years or older
. According to 2012 census, there were 270,629 males and 271,009 females in Suriname.

Total and Percent Distribution of Population by Age (Censuses 2004 & 2012)

Structure of the population 

Structure of the population (02.08.2004) (Census): 

Structure of the population (01.07.2011) (Estimates) :

Vital statistics
The Population Departement of the United Nations prepared the following estimates for Suriname.

Births and deaths

Ethnic groups

The census used self-identification for ethnic classification.
Amerindians are the original inhabitants of Suriname.
East Indians, also known locally as Hindustanis, are those whose ancestors emigrated from northern British India in the latter part of the 19th century.
Creoles are descendants from slaves from Africa.  Prior to the 2004 census, mixed-race people were counted as Creoles. Their ancestors were brought to the country in the 17th and 18th centuries.
The Maroons are descendants from slaves from Africa that escaped to the interior of Suriname. Their proportion has increased considerably during the past decades, from 9% in 1964 to 22% in 2012. Part of this increase is probably caused by interchanging identities of Creole and Maroon, causing a decrease in the proportion of Creole and an increase in the proportion Maroon.
The Javanese are Asians from formerly Dutch-ruled Indonesia.
Whites are principally descended from Dutch colonists.

The current population of Suriname will be different to these census figures, as the census records residents, and notes legal visitors, but does not record illegal immigrants.  According to estimates there may be as many as:
 60,000 Brazilians (estimates varies between 20,000 and 80,000) from Brazil. There are also other smaller numbers of South American nationalities.
 40,000 Chinese, with small communities of Koreans, Japanese and Filipinos.
 2,000 Arab/Middle Eastern (mostly Lebanese but also Syrian and Palestinians).
 200 Jews who are identified in ethnoreligious terms.
 Cherokee people - in the late 19th century, Suriname as well Venezuela, Guyana, Brazil and Chile attracted tens of thousands of settlers from the Indian Territory of the United States, now part of the state of Oklahoma. The exact number of Cherokee descendants is unknown.
 Suriname has large American expatriate (mostly retiree) communities (about 50,000 Americans live in Suriname).
 Also living in Suriname are Dutch citizens, some of which with a Surinamese background.

Fertility rate by ethnic group
The total fertility rate for Suriname as a whole is 2.53 children per woman aged 15 to 49. Maroons have the highest fertility rate, with 4.47 children per woman. On the other hand, Hindustani's have the lowest fertility with 1.78 children per woman.

Languages
Dutch is the official language of Suriname and the mother tongue of around 60% of the population. Sranan Tongo is the lingua franca and second most spoken language of Suriname.

English is mostly used in the business sector mainly to communicate with foreign businesses. It is also used in the hospitality industry to communicate with tourists.

Sarnami Hindustani is spoken by the Surinamese Indian community. Depending on the person this language can be either the mother tongue, second language or third language (after Dutch or Sranan Tongo).

Saramaccan is spoken by the Saramaka tribe of the Maroon community. Aukan is mainly spoken by the Aukan tribe of the Maroon community

Javanese is spoken by the Surinamese Javanese community. Just like Sarnami Hindustani, Javanese can be either the mother tongue, second language or third language (after Dutch or Sranan Tongo) for some.

Hakka and Cantonese is spoken by Surinamese Chinese, mainly as a second language after Dutch. Cantonese was introduced in Suriname by the second wave of Chinese immigrants in 1970. Beginning in the 1990s new migrants from China moved to Suriname, and Putonghua, during circa 2004–2014, became the main Chinese lingua franca in the country.

French is spoken by some Maroons due to the cultural influence from French Guiana, Portuguese mainly by immigrants from Brazil and Portugal, and Spanish due to immigrants from, Cuba, Venezuela, Colombia, and other Latin American countries.

Amerindian languages are spoken by the Surinamese Amerindian community. Languages include Carib, Arawak, Tiriyó and Wayana.

Religion

References